Salwa Alsabah Sport Club is a Kuwaiti football organization. It was founded in 2009 and was at first dedicated to women athletes. It joined the Kuwaiti Women's League in 2017 as an official competing club.

See also
Kuwaiti Women's League
VIVA Premier League

References

Women's football clubs in Kuwait
Football clubs in Kuwait City
2009 establishments in Kuwait
2017 establishments in Kuwait
Association football clubs established in 2009
Articles which contain graphical timelines
Sports teams in Kuwait